José Padilla is the name of:

 José Gualberto Padilla (1829–1896), Puerto Rican poet, politician and advocate of Puerto Rican independence
 José Prudencio Padilla (1784–1828), Colombian military leader
 José Trinidad Padilla (born 1957), Mexican IRP politician
 José Padilla (composer) (1889–1960), "Maestro Padilla", Spanish composer
 José Padilla Sr. (1888–1945), Filipino politician and actor
 José Padilla Jr. (1911–1978), Filipino actor & boxer
 José Padilla (born 1950), U.S.-resident Honduran in the Padilla v. Kentucky case
 José Padilla (DJ) (1955–2020), Spanish DJ
 José Padilla (criminal) (born 1970), United States citizen convicted of aiding terrorists
 José Padilla (academic administrator), president of Valparaiso University beginning 2021

See also
José Padilha (born 1967), Brazilian film director, producer and writer
Juan José Padilla (born 1973), Spanish torero ('bullfighter')